RFA Olna (A216) was one of two ships built for Shell. She was originally named Hyalina and taken up for Fleet Service soon after building.

She was taken into service as a fleet tanker of the Royal Fleet Auxiliary (RFA). The ship was built for service with the British Pacific Fleet against Japan, and was commissioned into the Royal Navy for that purpose. However, after the Second World War the ship was quickly transferred to the RFA, making the move in 1946. Olna was crucial to the development of replenishment at sea doctrines for the British fleet, and saw service up until 1966.

In 1955 when serving with the Mediterranean fleet, Olna was used in the making of the film Battle of the River Plate to depict the German supply ship .

References
 RFA Olna at RFA Ships

Tankers of the Royal Fleet Auxiliary
1944 ships